The 2012 Apia International Sydney was a joint ATP and WTA tennis tournament, that was played on outdoor hard courts. It was the 120th edition of the Apia International Sydney and was a part of the ATP World Tour 250 series of the 2012 ATP World Tour, and of the WTA Premier tournaments of the 2012 WTA Tour. Both the men's and the women's events took place at the NSW Tennis Centre in Sydney, Australia, from 8 to 15 January 2012. Due to rain, the Men's Singles and Double's finals had to be rescheduled from the evening of 14 January to the morning of 15 January, the day before the Australian Open was due to begin. Jarkko Nieminen and Victoria Azarenka won the singles titles.

ATP singles main-draw entrants

Seeds

|-
1 Rankings as of 26 December 2011.

Other entrants
The following players received wildcards into the singles main draw:
  James Duckworth
  Matthew Ebden
  Lleyton Hewitt

The following players received entry from the qualifying draw:
  Denis Istomin
  Jarkko Nieminen
  Bobby Reynolds
  Michael Russell

The following players received entry from a lucky loser spot:
  Ryan Sweeting

Withdrawals
  Florian Mayer (right hip injury)

ATP doubles main-draw entrants

Seeds

1 Rankings are as of 26 December 2011

Other entrants
The following pairs received wildcards into the doubles main draw:
  Matthew Ebden /  Jarkko Nieminen
  Colin Ebelthite /  Marinko Matosevic

WTA singles main-draw entrants

Seeds

1 Rankings as of 26 December 2011

Other entrants
The following players received wildcards into the singles main draw:
  Jelena Dokić
  Isabella Holland

The following players received entry from the qualifying draw:
  Sofia Arvidsson
  Melinda Czink
  Ekaterina Makarova
  Urszula Radwańska
  Chanelle Scheepers
  Stefanie Vögele

The following players received entry from a lucky loser spot:
  Alexandra Dulgheru
  Polona Hercog

Withdrawals
  Sabine Lisicki (abdominal strain)
  Flavia Pennetta (back injury)

Retirements
  Julia Görges (viral illness)
  Svetlana Kuznetsova (heat illness)

WTA doubles main-draw entrants

Seeds

1 Rankings are as of 26 December 2011

Other entrants
The following pairs received wildcards into the doubles main draw:
  Sofia Arvidsson /  Jelena Dokić
  Lucie Šafářová /  Vera Zvonareva
The following pairs received entry as alternates:
  Stephanie Bengson /  Tyra Calderwood
  Eleni Daniilidou /  Tamarine Tanasugarn

Withdrawals
  Julia Görges (viral illness)
  Agnieszka Radwańska

Finals

Men's singles

 Jarkko Nieminen defeated  Julien Benneteau, 6–2, 7–5
 It was Nieminen's 1st title of the year and 2nd title of his career.

Women's singles

 Victoria Azarenka defeated  Li Na, 6–2, 1–6, 6–3
It was Azarenka's 1st title of the year and 9th of her career. It was her 1st Premier-level title of the year and 3rd of her career.

Men's doubles

 Bob Bryan /  Mike Bryan defeated  Matthew Ebden /  Jarkko Nieminen, 6–1, 6–4

Women's doubles

 Květa Peschke /  Katarina Srebotnik defeated  Liezel Huber /  Lisa Raymond, 6–1, 4–6, [13–11]

References

External links
 of the Apia International Sydney

 
Apia International Sydney, 2012